Estadio Moderno Julio Torres is a multi-use stadium in Barranquilla, Colombia.

The stadium was given national monument status in July 2006.

The stadium was named as the host for the Women's football tournament at the 2018 Central American and Caribbean Games.

References 

Sports venues completed in 1922
Football venues in Colombia
1922 establishments in Colombia
Buildings and structures in Barranquilla
National Monuments of Colombia